The Sidi Saiyyed Mosque, popularly known as Sidi Saiyyid ni Jali locally, built in 1572–73 AD (Hijri year 980), is one of the most famous mosques of  Ahmedabad, a city in the state of Gujarat, India. The mosque was built by Sidi Sayyad, a Habshi nobleman, in 1572-73.

History 
The Sidi Saiyyed Mosque, popularly known as Sidi Saiyyid ni Jali locally, built in 1572-73 AD (Hijri year 980), is one of the most famous mosques of Ahmedabad, a city in the state of Gujarat, India.
As attested by the marble tablet fixed on the wall of the mosque, it was built by Shaikh Sa'id Al-Habshi Sultani. Sidi Sa'id was originally a slave of Rumi Khan, a Turkish general who had come to Gujarat from Yemen, bringing along with him his Habshi slaves. Sidi Sa'id later served Sultan Mahmud III, and upon his death, joined the Abyssinian general Jhujhar Khan. Upon Sidi Sa'id's retirement from military service, Jhujhar Khan granted him a jagir. Sidi Sa'id over his career became a prominent nobleman: he collected a library, owned over a hundred slaves, performed the Hajj pilgrimage, and instituted a langar (public kitchen). Previously at the site there was a smaller brick mosque, which was rebuilt by Sidi Sa'id, and he was buried near the mosque when he died in 1576. The mosque was built in the last year of the existence of Gujarat Sultanate.

During the rule of the Marathas, the mosque fell into disuse and disrepair. During the British colonial period, it served as an office or kachery for the Mamlatdar of Dascrohi taluka. During its time as an office, doors were installed, the mihrabs were converted into presses, and the interior was whitewashed. During an official visit to Ahmadabad, Lord Curzon, Viceroy of India, ordered the Mamlatdar's office to vacate the premises, as part of his wider policies of preserving historic monuments.

Architecture 

The mosque is entirely arcuated and is known for its ten intricately carved stone latticework windows (jalis) on the side and rear arches. The rear wall is filled with square stone pierced panels in geometrical designs. The two bays flanking the central aisle have reticulated stone slabs carved in designs of intertwined trees and foliage and a palm motif. This intricately carved lattice stone window is the Sidi Saiyyed Jali, the unofficial symbol of city of Ahmedabad and the inspiration for the design of the logo of the Indian Institute of Management Ahmedabad.

The central window arch of the mosque, where one would expect to see another intricate jali, is instead walled with stone. This is possibly because the mosque was not completed according to plan before the Mughals invaded Gujarat.

Gallery

See also
 Imamshah Bawa Dargah

References

Mosques in Ahmedabad
1573 in India
Religious buildings and structures completed in 1573
Monuments of National Importance in Gujarat
Indo-Islamic architecture
Sunni mosques in India
Siddhi people